Gametocytogenesis is the creation of gametocytes by mitotic division of gametogonia. Males and females of a species that reproduces sexually have different forms of gametocytogenesis:

 spermatocytogenesis (male)
 oocytogenesis (female)